Ruff Draft is an EP reissued as a studio album by American hip hop producer and rapper J Dilla released under the moniker "Jay Dee".  It was originally released in February 2003 as an EP, by his then-newly founded label, Mummy Records, and distributed by Groove Attack, a German record label. In 2007, Ruff Draft was extended, remastered, and posthumously re-released as a "solo album" by Stones Throw Records. The re-release sold 8,049 copies in its first week, J Dilla's largest first-week sales as a solo artist.

Overview
The original vinyl release of Ruff Draft is now out-of-print. Although the album is one of Jay Dee's lesser known works, it includes some of his most abstract and experimental work, all self-produced, and recorded in under a week.
As stated in the introduction of the album, it's a noncommercial sounding lo-fi hip hop album, which sees the producer playfully toying with different styles, such as on "Nothing Like This," where his vocals are distorted and skewered over an equally eccentric production featuring a sample played backwards. The result mirrors the more off-center moments on Common's Electric Circus, which Dilla also worked on. In regards to the project's name and creation, Dilla has stated:

″That was a quickie. I did it in four or five days, turned it in and had wax in ten days. If I'm not doing beats for somebody, I make stuff for me to drive around and listen to, and that was one of those projects. I was just doing me. That's why it was called the 'Ruff Draft' EP.″

Stones Throw Records re-issued the album on CD and vinyl on March 20, 2007. The re-release is remastered from the original master tapes, with sound engineers taking steps to maintain the original release's integrity, along with additional songs, as well as an instrumental CD.

Notes
 Ruff Draft was released after the artist began using the name J Dilla but the cover still lists 'Jay Dee'.
 It is also the first release to bear the name 'Jaylib' (in the liner notes); J Dilla and Madlib's group which would not debut until a few months after the release of Ruff Draft.
 Jaylib's "Ice" contains lyrics heard in the final seconds of the Ruff Draft track "Make'em NV".
 J Dilla went on a short promotional tour in 2003, performing DJ sets with Dank of Frank-N-Dank following the release of Ruff Draft:
 Jan. 15th — Helsinki FIN at Kerma Club
 Jan. 17th — Eindhoven, NL at Effenaar
 Jan. 18th — Bienne, SWI at La Coupole
 Jan. 19th — Paris, FR at Divan du Monde
 Jan. 24th — Gothenburg, SWD
 Jan. 25th — Malmo, SWD at Inkonst Quality
 Jan. 26th — Stockholm, SWD at Mosebacke Est.

Track listing

Samples Used
"Lets Take It Back" contains interpolated lyrics from "Verses From the Abstract" by A Tribe Called Quest and samples of "Pause" by Jay Dee (featuring Frank-N-Dank)
"Reckless Driving" contains interpolated lyrics from "What?" by A Tribe Called Quest and samples of "Pause" by Jay Dee
"The $" contains interpolated lyrics from "Paid In Full" by Eric B & Rakim and samples of "Dooinit" by Common , "Pause" by Jay Dee and "Escape (I Need A Break)" by Whodini
"Make 'Em NV" contains samples of "La Rotta" by John Renbourn and "Ante Up" by M.O.P.
"Crushin'" contains samples of "Sweet Stuff" by Sylvia Robinson
"Intro (Alt.)" contains samples of "Hold You Close" by P'taah
"Wild" contains samples of "Cum On Feel the Noize" by Neil Innes & Son
"Take Notice" contains samples of "Soul Love" by David Bowie and "Phase By Phase" by Peter Baumann

References

External links
 Ruff Draft reissued

J Dilla albums
Albums produced by J Dilla
2003 EPs
Stones Throw Records EPs